Hans Axel Valdemar Corell (born July 7, 1939) is a Swedish lawyer and diplomat. Between March 1994 and March 2004 he was Under-Secretary-General for Legal Affairs and the Legal Counsel of the United Nations. In this capacity, he was head of the Office of Legal Affairs in the United Nations Secretariat.

Before joining the United Nations in 1994, Corell was an Ambassador and Under-Secretary for Legal and Consular Affairs in the Swedish Ministry for Foreign Affairs. Hans Corell graduated with a Master of Laws at Uppsala University. He currently sits on the advisory board of The International Center for Ethics, Justice and Public Life at Brandeis University and on the boards of the Human Rights Institute of the International Bar Association and the International Science Programme. He was chairman of the board of trustees of the Raoul Wallenberg Institute of Human Rights and Humanitarian Law at Lund University from 2006 to 2012.

The Crimes Against Humanity Initiative 
Corell is on the Steering Committee of The Crimes Against Humanity Initiative, launched in 2008 by the Whitney R. Harris World Law Institute to study the need for a comprehensive convention on the prevention and punishment of crimes against humanity, analyze the necessary elements of such a convention, and draft a proposed treaty. The proposed treaty is now being debated before the UN International Law Commission.

World Justice Project

Hans Corell serves as an Honorary Co-Chair for the World Justice Project. The World Justice Project works to lead a global, multidisciplinary effort to strengthen the Rule of Law for the development of communities of opportunity and equity.

Lectures
The Role of a Legal Adviser of an International Organization in the Lecture Series of the United Nations Audiovisual Library of International Law

See also
 United Nations Secretary-General
 Hans Blix

References

External links 
Hans Corell's Homepage.
Biography at United Nations.
Information from the Legal Counsel.
Raoul Wallenberg Institute of Human Rights and Humanitarian Law.
Brandeis institute for international judges.
Secretary-General Kofi Annan's Prayer for Peace.

1939 births
Living people
Swedish diplomats
Uppsala University alumni